Terry Sanders (born December 20, 1931) is an American filmmaker having produced and/or directed more than 70 dramatic features, televisions specials, documentaries and portrait films. He co-heads the American Film Foundation and has produced and photographed the Oscar-winning dramatic short A Time Out of War. He also received an Academy Award for Best Documentary Feature for Maya Lin: A Strong Clear Vision. He also produced and co-directed Crime & Punishment, USA with his now-deceased brother, Denis Sanders.

Archive
The moving image collection of Terry Sanders is housed at the Academy Film Archive.

Filmography 

The Eyes of Don Bachardy
Return with Honor, presented by Tom Hanks
Never Give Up: The 20th Century Odyssey of Herbert Zipper
Maya Lin: A Strong Clear Vision (Oscar win) 
 Into the Future: On the Preservation of Knowledge in the Electronic Age, narrated by Robert MacNeil (includes an interview with Tim Berners-Lee and Peter Norton of Norton Utilities)
 Rose Kennedy: A Life to Remember, narrated by Edward Kennedy (Oscar nomination) 
 Lillian Gish: The Actor's Life for Me
 Screenwriters: Words Into Image
 War Hunt
 Crime & Punishment, USA
 A Time Out of War
 Copland Portrait, American Composer with Aaron Copland
 The Japan Project: Made in Japan
 Portrait of Zubin Mehta
 Fighting for Life
 Four Stones for Kanemitsu (Oscar nomination) 
 To Live or Let Die
 Slow Fires: On the Preservation of the Human Record (1987)

See also 
 American Film Foundation (co-founder)
 Denis Sanders

References

External links 

American film directors
1931 births
Living people
Directors of Live Action Short Film Academy Award winners
University of California, Los Angeles alumni